Arena Varna is a new multi-purpose all-seater stadium currently under construction in Varna, Bulgaria, which is going to be built directly, just rotated to lie on the north-south axis, in the place of the former Yuri Gagarin Stadium. Once finished, the stadium will be used mostly for football matches and will also be the new home ground of the local Cherno More Varna. The venue will have a capacity of 22,000 spectators. Due to financial crises in Bulgaria, the stadium’s construction has been put on hold multiple times. As of June 2020, the stadium is yet to be completed.

History

Project
It was due to open in 2013 and would have a capacity of 30,000 spectators with a possible expansion to 40,000. The stadium, as part of Sport Complex Varna, will have an underground parking area, convertible roof covers, office lounges, two-tier stands and four  towers, which will block the pressure of the terrain and bring the stadium in a shape of a ship. The convertible roof covers would be made of transparent panels, which would allow the light of the floodlights to stream inside the pitch during night matches. The venue would be awarded with an elite stadium rating by UEFA.

The sport complex and its concept were designed by the German architectural company GMP International GmbH, which built several stadiums for the 2006 FIFA World Cup, including the renovation of the Olympiastadion in Berlin and the construction of the Commerzbank-Arena in Frankfurt respectively.
The stadium was also proposed to support a possible bid as a venue for the Euro 2020, which Bulgaria and Romania were planning to host.
The construction officially started on September 12, 2008, with the demolishing of the former Yuri Gagarin Stadium.

In the follow-up years, the initial project by GMP International GmbH was partially redesigned due to the financial crisis in 2009 that affected the stadium's construction. As a result, the capacity of the stadium was reduced to 22,000 spectators, the transparent roof covers were replaced and the  roof towers were removed from the original design.

Construction
The construction of the new stadium was on hold since 2009, as it was seriously affected from the global financial crisis of 2007-08 and the subsequent lack of funding. In the summer of 2015, however, after public pressure and debates for the need of a new stadium in Varna, the local governors, also represented in the ownership of the stadium as minority shareholders, received 30% of the funding from the sale of a nearby lot. The stadium's construction finally commenced, with Bulgarian construction company Planex being the main contractor. It is expected to be finished by the fall of 2018, with the first match being played in early 2019.

As of summer 2022, the stadium remains under construction.

References

External links
  Stadium website
  Stadium information

PFC Cherno More Varna
Football venues in Bulgaria
Stadiums under construction
Sports venues in Varna, Bulgaria